is a Japanese professional golfer. In 2006 he became the first modern-era golfer to make two hole in one shots in the same round of a PGA Tour event, at the Reno-Tahoe Open in Nevada.

Early life and amateur career
Miyazato was born in Higashi, Okinawa Prefecture, Japan. He attended Tohoku Fukushi University, and won the Japanese collegiate championship in 2000, and the Japanese Amateur Championship in 2001.  In December 2002, he announced his decision to turn pro before his upcoming graduation. He currently plays on the Japan Golf Tour.

Professional career
At the time of his holes in one, the PGA Tour announced that it was the first time since they had started keeping records. However, research later turned up confirming that an amateur golfer, W.W. "Bill" Whedon, also hit two in the opening round of the 1955 Insurance City Open.

In November 2015, Miyazato won the Dunlop Phoenix event, one of the more prestigious events on the Japan Golf Tour to earn his third tour level victory. He shot rounds of 64-69 on the weekend to win by two strokes. In April 2017, Miyazato won his fourth event on the Japanese Tour, The Crowns, followed two weeks later by another win in the Japan PGA Championship Nissin Cupnoodles Cup.

At the 2017 Indonesian Masters, Miyazato finished in solo 4th, earning enough Official World Golf Ranking points to finish the year in the Top 50, thus earning an invitation to the 2018 Masters Tournament, his first appearance.

Personal life
His younger sister, Ai Miyazato, is also a professional golfer and currently competes on the LPGA Tour.

Professional wins (8)

Japan Golf Tour wins (7)

Other wins (1)
2013 Kyusyu Open

Results in major championships

CUT = missed the half-way cut
"T" = tied for place

Results in World Golf Championships

QF, R16, R32, R64 = Round in which player lost in match play
"T" = tied

Team appearances
Amateur
Eisenhower Trophy (representing Japan): 1998, 2000, 2002
Bonallack Trophy (representing Asia/Pacific): 2000, 2002 (winners)

References

External links
 

Japanese male golfers
Japan Golf Tour golfers
Asian Games medalists in golf
Asian Games gold medalists for Japan
Asian Games bronze medalists for Japan
Golfers at the 1998 Asian Games
Medalists at the 1998 Asian Games
Golfers at the 2002 Asian Games
Medalists at the 2002 Asian Games
Sportspeople from Okinawa Prefecture
1980 births
Living people